Palace Hotel may refer to:

Film
Palace Hotel (film)

Places

Australia
Palace Hotel, Broken Hill, New South Wales, a pub
Palace Hotel, Childers, Queensland
Palace Hotel, Perth, Western Australia
Palace Hotel, Kalgoorlie, Western Australia

China
Peace Hotel South Building, formerly Palace Hotel, Shanghai

Denmark
Palace Hotel (Copenhagen)

Egypt
Sofitel Winter Palace Hotel, Luxor

Finland
Palace Hotel, Helsinki

Hungary
Palace Hotel, Miskolc, Hungary

Japan
Palace Hotel, Tokyo

Poland
Palace, a hotel in Poland used by the Gestapo during the Nazi occupation, where Jadwiga Apostoł was brought

Portugal
Buçaco Palace, Serra do Buçaco, Mealhada

Romania
Athenee Palace Hilton Bucharest Hotel

Russia
Palace Hotel, Rostov-on-Don

Slovenia
Kempinski Palace Portorož, formerly Palace Hotel

Switzerland
Badrutt's Palace Hotel, St. Moritz, Switzerland

Turkey
Mardan Palace, Lara, Antalya

United Kingdom
Palace Hotel, Bristol, a pub
Palace Hotel, Buxton
Palace Hotel, London, now part of 1 Palace Street
Birkdale Palace Hotel, Lancashire
Regent Palace Hotel, London
Strand Palace Hotel, London
The Principal Manchester, previously Palace Hotel, Manchester

United States

 Palace Hotel, San Francisco, California
Palace Hotel Residential Tower
 Palace Hotel (Ukiah, California), listed on the National Register of Historic Places (NRHP) in Mendocino County, California
 Palace Hotel (Antonito, Colorado), listed on the NRHP in Conejos County, Colorado
 Palace Hotel (Cripple Creek, Colorado), a location in an episode of Haunted History
 Brown Palace Hotel (Denver, Colorado)
 Palace Hotel (Butler, Missouri), listed on the NRHP in Missouri
 Palace Hotel (Springfield, Missouri), listed on the NRHP in Greene County, Missouri
 Palace Hotel (Missoula, Montana)
 Palace Hotel (Gallup, New Mexico), listed on the NRHP in McKinley County, New Mexico
 Lotte New York Palace Hotel, New York
 Cincinnatian Hotel, formerly Palace Hotel, Cincinnati, Ohio)
 Lane Hotel (Eugene, Oregon), listed on the NRHP as Palace Hotel
 Palace Hotel, Heppner, Oregon (destroyed)
 Brown Palace Hotel (Mobridge, South Dakota)
 Palace Hotel (Houston), Texas, listed on the NRHP
 Palace Hotel (Port Townsend, Washington)

See also
Palace (disambiguation)
 South Shore Cultural Center, Chicago, Illinois, used as a set for the Palace Hotel Ballroom in The Blues Brothers